Kevin Atlas (formerly Kevin Clinton Laue; born April 13, 1990) is a  tall, former American college student and basketball player at Manhattan College. He was born missing half of one arm and has been recognized for his skills and success in overcoming adversity. In the 2008–2009 season he played at a military academy in Virginia and was a prospect for collegiate play. In March 2009 he received a scholarship to play Division I basketball for Manhattan College. A documentary film titled Long Shot: The Kevin Laue Story was released in 2012. Atlas now works as a speaker, and has authored a motivational book entitled "Get in the Game."

Biography
Due to a restriction of prenatal blood circulation, Atlas was born with a left arm that ended just below his elbow; he has a short rounded stump of his forearm. His parents encouraged him to play soccer as a child, but Kevin did not like soccer. He also refused to use a prosthetic arm. He had some struggles as a youth basketball player, but by eighth grade he had grown enough that he could handle a ball with one hand and could dunk a basketball.

Competitive playing career

High school
Atlas attended Amador Valley High School near his home where as a junior he played center on the varsity basketball team. He played about 23 minutes a game and averaged eight points, six blocks and eight rebounds per game.

During his junior year, he was described as the team's star. In 2007 Sports Illustrated called him "the most exciting player in basketball" in recognition of his playing prowess with just one hand, but he missed most of his senior year due to a broken leg, (Averaging eleven points, ten blocks, and nine rebounds per game his final year).

After graduation, he enrolled as a postgraduate at Fork Union Military Academy in Virginia for the 2008–2009 school year. As of December 2008, his season statistics at Fork Union were 6.9 points and 7.4 rebounds per game. As an NCAA prospect, he received recruiting letters from Division III schools, but hoped to be able to play for a Division I team. Scouts, Inc. describes him as a "prospect that could instantly help a number of low-major Division I programs," noting his "quick leaping ability" and effective play on both offense and defense. In March 2009 he was awarded a scholarship from Manhattan College, a Division I school.

Kevin wears size 17 shoes and can handle the ball in his large right hand, which an Amador Valley teammate said "is as big as two normal hands." He uses his short forearm stump (which he calls his 'nub') to help grip the ball after catching a pass. He also uses his stump effectively in defense, despite its short length, using its surprising strength to block opposing players.

College
Atlas played his first two seasons with Manhattan College under coach Barry Rohrssen. For his junior season, he played under coach Steve Masiello. As a freshman in the 2009–10 season, Atlas played in 19 games with an average 2.7 minutes per game and 0.7 rebounds and 0.2 blocks. On December 30, 2009, Atlas scored his first career point with a free throw and grabbed a season-high eight rebounds in 17 minutes in Manhattan's 86–48 loss to Vanderbilt. Atlas subsequently scored on field goals in two other games.

In 2010–11, his sophomore year, Atlas played in 22 games and started three games. On December 11 against Binghamton, Atlas played 14 minutes and scored 6 points on 3-for-4 shooting. In that game, Atlas also made 3 rebounds and 2 blocks. On December 22 against Bowling Green, Atlas played 13 minutes, scored 4 points off field goals, and made 5 rebounds. Cumulatively, Atlas made 21 rebounds and 5 blocks this season. In his junior year, 2011–12, Atlas grabbed 9 rebounds and blocked 7 shots. Manhattan qualified for the 2012 CollegeInsider.com Postseason Tournament, but Atlas did not play in the tournament.

After graduating from Manhattan College in only three years, Atlas's career totals came to 36 points, 42 rebounds, 15 blocks, 1 steal, and 1 assist.

References

External links
 Interview of Kevin Laue - Associated Press
 CBS News - Player Beats the Odds
 Long Shot: The Kevin Laue Story

1990 births
Living people
American disabled sportspeople
Basketball players from San Jose, California
Centers (basketball)
Manhattan Jaspers basketball players
People from Pleasanton, California
American men's basketball players